Gyllenborg is a surname. Notable people with the surname include:

 Carl Gyllenborg (1679–1746), Swedish statesman and author
 Fredrik Gyllenborg (1767–1829), Swedish Prime Minister
 Gustaf Fredrik Gyllenborg (1731–1808), Swedish writer

 Gyllenborg is also a primary school in Tromsø, Norway.